Forest is a 1980 Soviet comedy film directed by Vladimir Motyl.

Plot 
The film tells about the elderly lady Gurmyzhskaya, who lives in the province. Suddenly, a nephew comes to her and Gurmyzhskaya begins to flirt with him.

Cast 
 Lyudmila Tselikovskaya as Gurmyzhskaya
 Boris Plotnikov as Gennadiy Neschastlivtzev
 Vyacheslav Kirilichev
 Stanislav Sadalskiy
 Elena Borzova
 Aleksandr Solovyov	
 Mikhail Pugovkin
 Kira Kreylis-Petrova	
 Viktor Tsepaev
 Yuriy Chernitsky

References

External links 
 

1980 films
1980s Russian-language films
Soviet comedy films
1980 comedy films